Tharuvana is a village in Vellamunda Panchayath of Wayanad district, Kerala, India. The place is a junction connecting the Vythiri-Tharuvana road to State Highway 54 running between Kuttiady and Mananthavady.

Etymology
The word "Tharuvana" is derived from Malayalam words "tharu" (meaning "please give") and Anna, as this place acted as a tax collection point during the British Raj.

History
The history of Tharuvana dates back to the Pazhassi Raja dynasty. Paliyana Manikadalayam temple four miles from Tharuvana is devoted to Lord Ayyapa on parithiyatukunnil and symbolizes the communal harmony in this region, which is open to all irrespective of caste, creed and religion.

Transportation
Tharuvana can be accessed from Mananthavady or Kalpetta. The Periya ghat road connects Mananthavady to Kannur and Thalassery.  The Thamarassery mountain road connects Calicut with Kalpetta. The Kuttiady mountain road connects Vatakara with Kalpetta and Mananthavady. The Palchuram mountain road connects Kannur and Iritty with Mananthavady.  The road from Nilambur to Ooty is also connected to Wayanad through the village of Meppadi.

The nearest railway station is at Mysore and the nearest airports are Kozhikode International Airport-120 km, Bengaluru International Airport-290 km, and   Kannur International Airport, 58 km.

See also

 Mazhuvannur Maha Siva Kshethram
 Karingari
 Paliyana
 Kommayad

References

Villages in Wayanad district
Mananthavady Area